Hadjer Mecerem (born 23 August 1996) is an Algerian judoka. She is a bronze medalist at the African Games.

Career 

In 2018, she competed in the women's 48 kg event at the Mediterranean Games held in Tarragona, Spain.

In 2019, she won the silver medal in the women's 48 kg event at the 2019 African Judo Championships held in Cape Town, South Africa.

Achievements

References

External links 
 

Living people
1996 births
Place of birth missing (living people)
Algerian female judoka
Mediterranean Games competitors for Algeria
Competitors at the 2018 Mediterranean Games
African Games medalists in judo
African Games bronze medalists for Algeria
Competitors at the 2019 African Games
21st-century Algerian people